Andrey Ivanovich Dumalkin (born 3 November 1972) is a Russian former rugby league footballer who played as a  for RC Lokomotiv Moscow in the Championship of Russia competition. He is the current coach of the Russia national beach rugby team and coach of SSHOR No. 111, He previously coached RC Zelenograd and is a Master of Sports of Russia.

Career
Dumalkin played in the second row in rugby league. He won many times the Championship of Russia and the Russian Cup for RC Lokomotiv Moscow, took part in the 2000 Rugby League World Cup  as part of the Russian national team . Of his first 15 rugby league seasons, he played 14 for Lokomotiv.

Coaching career
As a coach, he is known coaching RC Zelenograd in the Russian rugby championship, with which he won the Moscow championship in 2013. He is a Member of the Bureau of the Rugby Union of Russia.

Background
Andrey Dumalkin was born in Moscow, USSR.

References

External links
Andrey Dumalkin player profile

1972 births
Living people
Russia national rugby league team players
Russian rugby league players
Sportspeople from Moscow
Rugby articles needing expert attention
Rugby league second-rows